Argentina at the 1960 Summer Olympics in Rome, Italy was the eleventh appearance out of fourteen editions of the 1960 Summer Olympics.
Argentina sent to the 1960 Summer Olympics its eighth national team, under the auspices of the Argentine Olympic Committee (Comité Olímpico Argentino), 91 athletes (all men), something which had not happened since the 1932 Games in Los Angeles and which has not happened since. Ironically, the flag bearer, a woman named Cristina Hardekopf, was a diver but was not included in the delegation as a participating athlete. However, Jorge Somlay, a rower, participated as Argentina's youngest Olympic competitor at only 13 years old.

The Olympic team won two medals, one bronze and one silver, and five Olympic diplomas. They placed 27th in total medal count over 83 participating countries.

The silver medal was one in yachting and the bronze in boxing, giving Argentina half of its medals and 3 out of five of its Olympic Diplomas (something which was usual until the 1968 Summer Olympics in Mexico City).

Argentina's performance in the games forms part of a period of scarce results, which was affected by scarce support for the Olympic Games by the state as well as other political reasons. Repeating what happened in the 1956 Games in Melbourne, Argentina did not win a single gold medal, and the two medals that they did win were far below their average winnings of 4-7 medals in all of the games from 1924 to 1952. In 2004 Argentina's Olympic success recovered to the levels it had during the 1924-1952 period.

Medalists

Athletics

Boxing

Cycling

Road

Track

Diving

Equestrian

Dressage

Eventing

Jumping

Fencing

Six fencers, all men, represented Argentina in 1960.

Individual

Note: Gustavo Vassallo was given a chance to advance to the second round in a Fence-Off (barrage) against Aleksandar Vasin from Yugoslavia, and Palle Frey of Denmark, but was eliminated.

Team

Football

Argentina qualified their men's team to compete in the 1960 Summer Olympics. They were unable to progress through the group stage after beating Tunisia, and Poland, but losing to Denmark. 18-year-old Juan Carlos Oleniak scored the most goals for Argentina with four.

Head coach: Ernesto Duchini

Results
Group Stage

Argentina failed to reach Semi-Finals.

Gymnastics

One male gymnast represented Argentina at the 1960 Games. Juan Caviglia competed in the individual all-around event which included the floor, pommel horse, rings, vault, and the parallel bars, horizontal bar. Caviglia's best result came in the floor in which he placed 92nd overall.

Modern pentathlon

Three male pentathletes represented Argentina at the 1960 Games, Luis Ribera, Carlos Stricker, and Raúl Bauza competed in both the men's individual, and the men's team events.

Rowing

Argentina had nine male rowers participate in three out of seven rowing events in 1960.

Sailing

Shooting

Swimming

Water polo

Group B
<onlyinclude>

Wrestling

References

External links
Olympic Games Official Report 1960 Rome-Volume I
Olympic Games Official Report 1960 Rome-Volume II (Part 1)

Nations at the 1960 Summer Olympics
1960
1960 in Argentine sport